Dee Cliffs (SSSI) is an area of cliffs on the eastern side of the Dee Estuary and to the west of Thurstaston on the Wirral Peninsula, England.

The area contains the best known example of clay cliff and bank habitat in Merseyside. The area also has some marl pits, which have a rich flora and fauna and an area of herb-rich neutral grassland.

Gallery

References

Sites of Special Scientific Interest in Merseyside
Beaches of Merseyside